David T. Wooster (September 5, 1891 – March 22, 1976) was an American football, basketball and track and field coach. He served as the head football coach (1921–1922), head basketball coach (1921–1923) and head track coach (1923) at San Jose State University.

Head coaching record

Football

References

External links
 

1891 births
1976 deaths
Emporia State Hornets baseball players
San Jose State Spartans football coaches
San Jose State Spartans men's basketball coaches
San Jose State Spartans track and field coaches
Kansas State University alumni
Baseball players from Kansas
Basketball coaches from Kansas